Reiten is a surname. Notable people with the surname include:

Eivind Reiten (born 1953), Norwegian economist, corporate officer and politician
Guro Reiten (born 1994), Norwegian professional footballer
Idun Reiten (born 1942), Norwegian professor of mathematics
Steinar Reiten (born 1963), Norwegian politician
Sverre Reiten (1891–1965), Norwegian politician